The 2000–01 season was the 122nd season of competitive association football and fourth season in the Premier League played by Ipswich Town, an English football club based in Ipswich, Suffolk. Their third-place finish in the Football League First Division in 1999–2000 season and victory in the play-off finals secured Ipswich Town a place in the Premier League. The season covers the period from 1 July 2000 to 30 June 2001.

Season summary
Tipped by many to go straight back down to Division One after winning promotion, Ipswich quickly wowed the Premiership with an unlikely challenge among the top six. For much of the season, it looked like they would finish in the top three and qualify for the European Cup for the first time in nearly 40 years. In the end, a 2–1 defeat at Charlton Athletic ended such hopes with two games left and they finished fifth, just four points adrift of second-placed Arsenal and qualified for the UEFA Cup for the first time since 1982. Manager George Burley was then voted "Manager of the Year" by his colleagues.

First-team squad
Squad at end of season

Left club during season

Reserve squad

Pre-season
Ipswich spent time on a pre-season tour of the Baltic states during the club's pre-season preparations for the 2000–01 season, playing friendly matches against Finnish side Vaasan Palloseura, Estonian side FC Flora and Latvian side Riga.

Competitions

FA Premier League

League table

Results summary

Results by round

Matches
Ipswich Town's season results

August

September

October

November

December

January

February

March

April

May

FA Cup

Football League Cup

Transfers

Transfers in

Loans in

Transfers out

Loans out

Transfers in:  £6,950,000
Transfers out:  £3,500,000
Total spending:  £3,450,000

Squad statistics
All statistics updated as of end of season

Appearances and goals

|-
! colspan=14 style=background:#dcdcdc; text-align:center| Goalkeepers

|-
! colspan=14 style=background:#dcdcdc; text-align:center| Defenders

|-
! colspan=14 style=background:#dcdcdc; text-align:center| Midfielders

|-
! colspan=14 style=background:#dcdcdc; text-align:center| Forwards

|-
! colspan=14 style=background:#dcdcdc; text-align:center| Players transferred/loaned out during the season

Goalscorers

Clean sheets

Disciplinary record

Starting 11
Considering starts in all competitions

Awards

Player of the Year

Premier League Manager of the Month

Premier League Manager of the Year

LMA Manager of the Year

References

Ipswich Town F.C. seasons
Ipswich Town